Esfahanak-e Abdol (also Romanized as Eşfahānak-e ‘Abdol) is a village in Chenarud-e Shomali Rural District, Chenarud District, Chadegan County, Isfahan Province, Iran. At the 2006 census, its population was 28, in 4 families.

References 

Populated places in Chadegan County